This event was held on Saturday 30 January 2010 as part of the 2010 UCI Cyclo-cross World Championships in Tábor, Czech Republic.
The length of the course was 15.66 km (0.16 km + 5 laps of 3.10 km each).

Ranking

Notes

External links
 Union Cycliste Internationale
 

Men's junior race
UCI Cyclo-cross World Championships – Men's junior race
2010 in cyclo-cross